"Better to Lie" is a song by American music producer Benny Blanco and American singers Jesse Rutherford and  Swae Lee. It was released by Friends Keep Secrets and Interscope on November 30, 2018.

Background
Benny Blanco first announced the song on November 27, 2018 via Twitter and Instagram. He stated that the song made him feel "like 15 again". Swae Lee and Jesse Rutherford also promoted the song through their social media accounts. Rutherford shared a clip of him playing a part of the song prior to release.

Track listing

Charts

Release history

References

2018 singles
2018 songs
Interscope Records singles
Benny Blanco songs
Song recordings produced by Benny Blanco
Song recordings produced by Cashmere Cat
Songs written by Ammar Malik
Songs written by Benny Blanco
Songs written by John Ryan (musician)
Songs written by Swae Lee
Swae Lee songs
Songs written by Cashmere Cat
Songs written by Happy Perez
Songs written by Jacob Kasher